Elinor Donahue (born Mary Eleanor Donahue, April 19, 1937) is an American actress, best known today for playing the role of Betty Anderson, the eldest child of Jim and Margaret Anderson on the 1950s American sitcom Father Knows Best.

Early life and career
Donahue was born in Tacoma, Washington, the daughter of Doris Genevieve (née Gelbaugh) and Thomas William Donahue on April 19, 1937.

Appearing in dancing-chorus film roles from the age of five, Donahue was at one point a ballet-school classmate of future Fred Astaire partner Barrie Chase. She was a child actress working in vaudeville and had several bit parts in movies as a teenager, including Love Is Better Than Ever (1952), starring Elizabeth Taylor. She played one of the daughters in Three Daring Daughters in 1948 and appeared as Mamie Van Doren's sister in Girls Town (1959).

Father Knows Best

Donahue achieved stardom for her role as the elder daughter, Betty, on the television family series Father Knows Best, which aired from 1954 to 1960. Her co-stars were Robert Young, Jane Wyatt, Billy Gray as her younger brother, James "Bud" Anderson, Jr., and Lauren Chapin as her younger sister, Kathy.

Donahue was a musical judge in ABC's Jukebox Jury (1953–54). While in the first season of Father Knows Best, she also appeared on The Ray Bolger Show, starring Ray Bolger as a song-and-dance man. Thereafter, she was cast with James Best, Ann Doran, and J. Carrol Naish in the 1956 episode "The White Carnation" of the religion anthology series, Crossroads. She guest starred on an episode of U.S. Marshal. She also appeared as a new bride in The George Burns and Gracie Allen Show episode titled "The Newlyweds" that aired April 2, 1956.

1960s to 1980s
Donahue played Georgiana Balanger, the niece of George and Martha Wilson, in the episode "Dennis and the Wedding" (1960) on Dennis the Menace. Donahue was also cast, in 1960, with Marion Ross in an episode ("Duet") of The Brothers Brannagan. She played Miriam Welby on ABC's The Odd Couple, Jane Mulligan on Mulligan's Stew, and Nurse Hunnicut on Days of Our Lives.

She was part of the main cast for the first season of CBS's The Andy Griffith Show, as Andy's  pharmacist love interest Ellie Walker, she was even mentioned in the opening credits before Don Knotts; after one season (1960–1961), Donahue asked for a release from her three-year contract.

In 1963, Donahue was cast in an episode of NBC's short-lived modern Western series, Redigo, with Richard Egan as the rancher Jim Redigo; then in 1964, she appeared as Melanie in "The Secret in the Stone" in the NBC medical drama dealing with psychiatry, The Eleventh Hour, starring Jack Ging and Ralph Bellamy.

Additionally, in 1963, she played Letty May in the episode "The Burning Tree" on Have Gun Will Travel.

In the 1964–65 broadcast season, Donahue costarred as Joan Randall, the daughter of Walter Burnley, played by John McGiver, on the CBS sitcom Many Happy Returns about the complaint department of a fictitious Los Angeles department store.

In 1966, she guest-starred on the TV series A Man Called Shenandoah, episode 8, "Town On Fire".
She guest-appeared on Star Trek in the second-season episode "Metamorphosis" (1967) as commissioner Nancy Hedford.

Donahue portrayed Miriam Welby in 17 episodes of The Odd Couple (1972–75).

Donahue appeared in a 1981 episode of One Day at a Time, as Alex's mother Felicia.

Donahue portrayed the sister of Sister Bertrille (Sally Field) in three episodes of ABC's The Flying Nun (1968–70). In 1977, she appeared in an episode of the ABC crime drama The Feather and Father Gang. In 1978, Donahue starred in the NBC sitcom Please Stand By.

In 1979, she appeared on Diff'rent Strokes as a fiancée to Mr. Drummond in season 1.

In 1984, she made an appearance as Mrs. Broderick, the mother of a teenage drug addict on the last season of Happy Days.

In 1987, she played the title character's mother in the short-lived Fox series The New Adventures of Beans Baxter. In 1988, she appeared in a Newhart episode ("Courtin' Disaster"), and she appeared in a 1989 episode of The Golden Girls as the newest wife of Dorothy Zbornak's ex-husband, Stan.

1990s and later
In 1990, she played Bridget, a Beverly Hills clothing-store manager, in the film Pretty Woman. Donahue played Gladys, the mother of Chris Peterson (Chris Elliott), in all 35 episodes of the sitcom Get a Life (1990–92), and had a recurring role as Rebecca Quinn on the CBS drama series Dr. Quinn, Medicine Woman.

In 1991, she portrayed the "Orphanage woman" in Freddy's Dead: The Final Nightmare.

In 1992, she voiced the mother on the Fox Kids animated series Eek! the Cat. In 1994, she made an appearance as Aunt Lillian in "The One Where Nana Dies Twice", an episode of Friends.  She played the part of Lorraine, Luther Van Dam's girlfriend, in season five of Coach in the early 1990s.

In 1998, Donahue published a memoir entitled In the Kitchen with Elinor Donahue, in which she relived some of her memories of Hollywood along with providing more than 150 of her recipes.

In September 2010, Donahue made an appearance on The Young and the Restless as Judge Anderson, one of Nikki Newman's old friends and also as the woman minister who will officiate at the wedding of Billy Abbott and Nikki's daughter, Victoria Newman. The wedding took place in front of the Abbotts' new home, which just happened to be a replica of the Anderson house from Father Knows Best.

In 2015, Donahue played the role of Mrs. Chumley in Judson Theatre Company's production of the Pulitzer Prize play Harvey, by Mary Chase. Donahue called the role her "swan song."

Filmography

Film

Television

Literature

References

Further reading
 Dye, David. Child and Youth Actors: Filmography of Their Entire Careers, 1914–1985. Jefferson, NC: McFarland & Co., 1988, pp. 58–59.

External links

Elinor Donahue interview at Archive of American Television

1937 births
Living people
American television actresses
American film actresses
American soap opera actresses
American voice actresses
Vaudeville performers
Actresses from Tacoma, Washington
20th-century American actresses
21st-century American actresses